The Niata or Ñata is an extinct breed of dwarf cattle from Uruguay and Argentina. It was observed and described by Charles Darwin in the 1830s. By the early twentieth century the Niata was nearly or completely extinct.

History 

An early description of the Niata is that from November 1833 by Charles Darwin, who twice saw cattle of this type. 

By the early twentieth century it was nearly or completely extinct.

References 

Extinct cattle breeds
Cattle breeds originating in Argentina
Cattle breeds originating in Uruguay
Cattle breeds